Shiva Mahimna Stotra is a Sanskrit composition (Stotra) in devotion of Shiva that is believed has been composed by a gandharva (heavenly being) named Pushpadanta. It essentially lists Shiva's various achievements and qualities.

The context
Pushpadanta was a gandharva, a celestial musician, in the court of god Indra, but also a lover of flowers and a devotee of Shiva.

Once he happened to see a beautiful garden adorned with charming flowers. It was the garden of king Chitraratha who was also a devotee of Shiva. The king used to offer flowers from his palatial garden as a symbol of his devotion to Shiva.

Pushpadanta was awestruck by the beauty of the garden and plucked flowers from the garden. Every day he tried to stop himself in vain, but plucked flowers. In the end, king Chitraratha was left with no flowers for his prayers to Shiva.

The king tried to find the thief, but Pushpadanta had a divine power of invisibility. The king then had an idea – he spread bilva leaves in his garden. Pushpadanta unknowingly stepped on the leaves. This act of desecration infuriated Shiva and he punished Pushpadanta by taking away his divine powers.

Pushpadanta knew the reason and in order to seek forgiveness, he composed a stotra (song of praise) in which he praised Shiva's greatness. Pleased with the poem, Shiva absolved him and returned his divine powers. This prayer became known as Shiva Mahimna Stotra.

References

Further reading 
Encyclopedia of Hinduism - Volumes on Shiva Ed. by Nagendra Kumar Singh

External links
This link contains Sanskrit text of the strotram

Hindu devotional texts
Shaivism
Sanskrit texts